James Alfred Field can relate to:

 James A. Field (1880–1927), American economist
 James A. Field Jr. (1916–1996), American historian